The Central District of Chaldoran County is in West Azerbaijan province, Iran. At the National Census in 2006, its population was 35,503 in 7,121 households. The following census in 2011 counted 37,819 people in 9,090 households. At the latest census in 2016, the district had 37,487 inhabitants in 9,817 households.

References 

Chaldoran County

Districts of West Azerbaijan Province

Populated places in West Azerbaijan Province

Populated places in Chaldoran County